The Changhua–Kaohsiung Viaduct is the world's second longest bridge. The bridge acts as a viaduct for part of the railway line of the Taiwan High Speed Rail network. Over 200 million passengers had been carried over it by December 2012.

Location
The viaduct starts in Baguashan (八卦山) in Changhua County and ends in Zuoying in Kaohsiung.

Changhua, Yunlin, Chiayi, and Tainan stations are Iocated on this viaduct.

Design
The railway is built across a vast series of viaducts, as they were designed to be earthquake resistant to allow for trains to stop safely during a seismic event and for repairable damage following a maximum design earthquake. Bridges built over known fault lines were designed to survive fault movements without catastrophic damage.

See also
 List of longest bridges in the world

References

2007 establishments in Taiwan
Bridges completed in 2007
Railway bridges in Taiwan
 
Viaducts in Taiwan